Louise Lagrange (19 August 1898  – 28 February 1979) was a French film actress.

Lagrange was born in Oran, French Algeria, and had a film career spanning from 1907 through 1951. Beginning her career as a child actor before the First World War, she appeared in French and American films, and was in the serial Les Vampires (1915–1916). She wed twice, with her first marriage to the film director Maurice Tourneur and the second to stage performer William Elliot.

Her sister was fellow actress Marthe Vinot, married first to Maurice Vinot and then to Pierre Blanchar and mother of Dominique Blanchar.  

She died in Paris in 1979.

Partial filmography
 A Roman Orgy (1911)
 Cinderella or the Glass Slipper (1913)
 Les Vampires (1915-1916)
 The Side Show of Life (1924)
 A Sainted Devil (1924)
 The Nude Woman (1926)
 The Orchid Dancer (1928)
 In the Shadow of the Harem (1929)
 The Wedding March (1929)
 The Night Is Ours (1930)
 The Little Escapade (1931)
 Judex (1934)
 Cage of Girls (1949)

References

Bibliography
 Goble, Alan. The Complete Index to Literary Sources in Film. Walter de Gruyter, 1999.

External links

1898 births
1979 deaths
French film actresses
French silent film actresses
20th-century French actresses
Pieds-Noirs
People from Oran